Alan Mozo Rodríguez (born 5 April 1997) is a Mexican professional footballer who plays as a right-back for Liga MX club Guadalajara.

Club career

UNAM
Mozo made his Liga MX debut on 16 September 2017, in a match that ended as a 1–1 tie against Guadalajara. At the end of the Clausura 2018, he was listed on the Best XI of the tournament.

Guadalajara
In May 2022, Mozo joined C.D. Guadalajara.

International career

Youth
In May 2019, Mozo was called up by Jaime Lozano to participate in that year's Toulon Tournament. In the first group stage match against Bahrain, he would win the Player of the match award. Playing all matches of the tournament, Mexico would place third in the competition.

Mozo also participated at the 2020 CONCACAF Olympic Qualifying Championship, where Mexico won the competition.

Senior
In September 2019, Mozo received his first senior national team call-up by Gerardo Martino for a set of friendly matches and on 2 October, he made his debut against Trinidad and Tobago.

Career statistics

Club

International

Honours
Mexico U23
CONCACAF Olympic Qualifying Championship: 2020

Individual
Liga MX Best XI: Clausura 2018
CONCACAF Champions League Best XI: 2022

References

Living people
1997 births
Footballers from Mexico City
Mexican footballers
Mexico international footballers
Club Universidad Nacional footballers
Liga MX players
Association football defenders